The 36th Japan Record Awards were held on December 31, 1994, and were broadcast live on TBS.

Award winners 
Japan Record Award:
Takeshi Kobayashi (producer), Kazutoshi Sakurai (Songwriter and Composer) & Mr. Children for "Innocent World"
Best Vocal Performance:
Miyuki Kawanaka
Best New Artist:
Yuki Nishio
Best Music Video:
"Rosier" by Luna Sea
"Kamisama no Hōseki de Dekita Shima" by Miya & Yami

External links
Official Website

Japan Record Awards
Japan Record Awards
Japan Record Awards
1994